Aristocreon (fl. 200 BC) was a Stoic philosopher and the nephew of Chrysippus.

Biography
Aristocreon was a son of the sister of Chrysippus, and became his pupil. Chrysippus dedicated several of his works to him. Of the few facts known about Aristocreon's life, it is known that between 229 and 190 BC, he was in Athens, where he obtained the official position of a Proxenos (a consular agent acting for another city). He was still alive in Athens in 184 BC.  Plutarch records that Aristocreon erected a bronze statue of his uncle on a pillar and engraved a verse to him:

It is not known whether this Aristocreon is the same as the author of a description of Egypt.

Notes

References
 
 

3rd-century BC births
2nd-century BC deaths
2nd-century BC philosophers
Hellenistic-era philosophers in Athens
Proxenoi
Stoic philosophers